Bursitis is the inflammation of one or more bursae (fluid filled sacs) of synovial fluid in the body. They are lined with a synovial membrane that secretes a lubricating synovial fluid. There are more than 150 bursae in the human body. The bursae rest at the points where internal functionaries, such as muscles and tendons, slide across bone. Healthy bursae create a smooth, almost frictionless functional gliding surface making normal movement painless. When bursitis occurs, however, movement relying on the inflamed bursa becomes difficult and painful. Moreover, movement of tendons and muscles over the inflamed bursa aggravates its inflammation, perpetuating the problem. Muscle can also be stiffened.

Signs and symptoms

Bursitis commonly affects superficial bursae. These include the subacromial, prepatellar, retrocalcaneal, and pes anserinus bursae of the shoulder, knee, heel and shin, etc. (see below). Symptoms vary from localized warmth and erythema to joint pain and stiffness, to stinging pain that surrounds the joint around the inflamed bursa. In this condition, the pain usually is worse during and after activity, and then the bursa and the surrounding joint becomes stiff the next morning.

Bursitis could possibly also cause a snapping, grinding or popping sound – known as snapping scapula syndrome – when it occurs in the shoulder joint. This is not necessarily painful.

Cause
There can be several concurrent causes. Trauma, auto-immune disorders, infection and iatrogenic (medicine-related) factors can all cause bursitis. Bursitis is commonly caused by repetitive movement and excessive pressure. Shoulders, elbows and knees are the most commonly affected. Inflammation of the bursae may also be caused by other inflammatory conditions such as rheumatoid arthritis, scleroderma, systemic lupus erythematosus, and gout. Immune deficiencies, including HIV and diabetes, can also cause bursitis. Infrequently, scoliosis can cause bursitis of the shoulders; however, shoulder bursitis is more commonly caused by overuse of the shoulder joint and related muscles.

Traumatic injury is another cause of bursitis. The inflammation irritates because the bursa no longer fits in the original small area between the bone and the functionary muscle or tendon. When the bone increases pressure upon the bursa, bursitis results. Sometimes the cause is unknown. It can also be associated with various other chronic systemic diseases.

Diagnosis

Types
The most common examples of this condition:
 Prepatellar bursitis, "housemaid's knee"
 Infrapatellar bursitis, "clergyman's knee"
 Trochanteric bursitis, giving pain over lateral aspect of hip
 Olecranon bursitis, "student's elbow", characterised by pain and swelling in the elbow
 Subacromial bursitis, giving shoulder pain, is the most common form of bursitis.
 Achilles bursitis
 Retrocalcaneal bursitis
 Ischial bursitis, "weaver's bottom"
 Iliopsoas bursitis
 Anserine bursitis

Treatment
It is important to differentiate between infected and non-infected bursitis. People may have surrounding cellulitis and systemic symptoms include a fever. The bursa should be aspirated to rule out an infectious process.

Bursae that are not infected can be treated symptomatically with rest, ice, elevation, physiotherapy, anti-inflammatory drugs and pain medication. Since bursitis is caused by increased friction from the adjacent structures, a compression bandage is not suggested because compression would create more friction around the joint. Chronic bursitis can be amenable to bursectomy and aspiration. Bursae that are infected require further investigation and antibiotic therapy. Steroid therapy may also be considered. In cases when all conservative treatment fails, surgical therapy may be necessary. In a bursectomy the bursa is cut out either endoscopically or with open surgery. The bursa grows back in place after a couple of weeks but without any inflammatory component.

See also
 Calcific bursitis
 Snapping scapula syndrome

References

External links 

 Bursitis treatment from NHS Direct
 Questions and Answers about Bursitis and Tendinitis – US National Institute of Arthritis and Musculoskeletal and Skin Diseases

Synovial bursae
Inflammations
Soft tissue disorders